Ageratina wrightii (Wright's snakeroot) is a North American species of plants in the family Asteraceae. It is native to the southwestern United States (New Mexico, southern Arizona, western Texas) and northern Mexico (Tamaulipas, Nuevo León, Coahuila, Chihuahua, San Luis Potosí, Durango, Zacatecas, Aguascalientes, Jalisco).

Etymology
Ageratina is derived from Greek meaning 'un-aging', in reference to the flowers keeping their color for a long time. This name was used by Dioscorides for a number of different plants.

The plant is named for American botanist Charles Wright (1811-1885).

References

wrightii
Flora of the South-Central United States
Plants described in 1852
Flora of the Southwestern United States